Lee Hightower (born July 28, 1993) is an American football safety who plays for X-League side Nojima Sagamihara Rise. He played college football at Houston and signed with the Colts as an undrafted free agent after the 2016 NFL Draft.

College career
Hightower played football at the University of Houston after transferring from Boise State in 2013.

Professional career

Indianapolis Colts
Hightower signed with the Indianapolis Colts as an undrafted free agent on August 2, 2016. He was released by the Colts on September 3, 2016 and was signed to the practice squad on September 9. He spent time on and off the Colts' practice squad before being waived on October 18, 2016.

Washington Redskins
On November 8, 2016, Hightower was signed to the Washington Redskins' practice squad. He was released by the Redskins on December 13, 2016.

Indianapolis Colts (second stint)
On January 12, 2017, Hightower signed a reserve/future contract with the Colts. He was waived on September 2, 2017.

References

External links
Houston Cougars bio

1993 births
Living people
Houston Cougars football players
Indianapolis Colts players
Washington Redskins players